The Garage (formerly known as The Mayfair) is a music venue and nightclub located at 490 Sauchiehall Street in Glasgow, Scotland. The club was founded by Donald C MacLeod MBE, a music impresario legend and veteran within Scotland's live music scene. It is Scotland's largest nightclub,  opening its doors in 1994. The main hall was the first Locarno ballroom in the UK, although it has since been remodelled by the addition of an extension to the mezzanine level.  

The Garage prides itself as being a nightclub open 7 days a week, 365 days a year. It is made up of various rooms which play different genres of music which are all accessed under one roof. The Main Hall, the biggest room, plays chart and remixes, G2 plays RnB hits, Desperados bar plays cheesy and nostalgia while the final room The Attic plays indie and rock. There is also a shot and cocktail bar located at the back of Desperados bar, with a quieter and more intimate vibe.

At the main entrance of the venue, you can see a yellow truck projecting out over the doors, making The Garage stand out on a street full of pubs and clubs. As a gig venue, it is primarily known as a stepping-stone for bands which are attempting to make their way to the top, which was very similar to the O2 ABC Glasgow, which unfortunately closed in 2018 due to a devasting fire. The Garage has hosted thousands of bands and artists over the years, including Prince, Biffy Clyro, One Direction, Kasabian and Marilyn Manson. They have also hosted events such as comedy nights and ICW wrestling matches. 
The Garage also has rooms available to be hired for public events.They can cater for over 300 people or provide smaller, exclusive rooms for private parties.

The venue is proudly owned by Holdfast Entertainment LTD who also own Cathouse Rock Club, situated in Glasgow city centre. The Garage has won more than 15 Best Bar None awards, a national award scheme aimed at responsible management and operation of alcohol licensed premises.

References

External links
Official website - Hold Fast Entertainment (Head Office)

Music venues in Glasgow
Nightclubs in Glasgow
Music venues completed in 1981
1981 establishments in Scotland
Insane Championship Wrestling